The following lists of U.S. counties by income are available :
 List of lowest-income counties in the United States
 List of highest-income counties in the United States